Oscar Emile, Knight van Rappard (2 April 1896 in Probolinggo, Dutch East Indies – 18 April 1962 in The Hague) was a track and field athlete and football (soccer) player from the Netherlands. He was the older brother of Ernst Herman van Rappard. As a forward, he played between 1912 and 1921 for HBS in The Hague. He represented his native country at two consecutive Summer Olympics, starting in 1920.

At his Olympic debut he won the bronze medal with the Netherlands national football team, while at the same tournament he ran the 110 m hurdles, where he was eliminated in the qualifying heats.

References

External links
  Dutch Olympic Committee

1896 births
1971 deaths
Dutch male hurdlers
Dutch footballers
Olympic athletes of the Netherlands
Olympic footballers of the Netherlands
Athletes (track and field) at the 1920 Summer Olympics
Athletes (track and field) at the 1924 Summer Olympics
Footballers at the 1920 Summer Olympics
Footballers at the 1924 Summer Olympics
Olympic bronze medalists for the Netherlands
Netherlands international footballers
Dutch nobility
Olympic medalists in football
People from Probolinggo
Medalists at the 1920 Summer Olympics
HBS Craeyenhout players
Association football forwards
Dutch people of the Dutch East Indies